The Waalbrug is an arch bridge over the Waal River in Nijmegen, Gelderland, the Netherlands.

Unlike many other bridges from the same period and with the same construction, like the IJsselbrug near Zwolle, the Graafsebrug and the bridge near Arnhem, the Waalbrug is an arch bridge in the literal sense: all forces truly work on the two pylons.

History

The bridge was opened on 16 June 1936 by Queen Wilhelmina of the Netherlands in presence of 200.000 people.

Until 1936 there was no permanent connection for ordinary traffic to the other side of the Waal. All traffic had to use the "Zeldenrust" ferry. Train traffic used a railway bridge since 1879.

In 1906 the "Nijmegen Vooruit" (Nijmegen Ahead) committee started planning the construction of the Waalbrug, but the First World War delayed the plans. In 1927 definitive plans had been made and construction of the bridge started October 23, 1931 after a plan of the architect G. Schoorl.

At the start of the Second World War the Dutch combat engineering units blew up the bridge to stop the German army's advance.
During the occupation the Germans restored the bridge and from 1943 it was in use for traffic again.

In 1944 the Germans planned to blow up the bridge again, but Jan van Hoof, a Rover Scout and member of the Dutch Resistance, managed to prevent this. On 20 September 1944, the bridge was conquered by allied forces. A plaque was added to the bridge as a reminder of van Hoof's actions.

The bridge was painted green until 1980, these days it is white.

Traffic

There is a bus lane on the west side of the Waalbrug. During the morning and evening rush hour there is often a large traffic jam on the bridge. Like the Keizer Karelplein, the bridge is one of the problem traffic thoroughfares in Nijmegen.

'De Oversteek' ('The Crossing') opened the 24th of november 2013 to ease the traffic congestion of the bridge. For cyclists there is the 'Snelbinder Bridge', which is connected to the rail bridge.

Once 'de Oversteek' opened the bridge was closed briefly for renovation work.

In 2005 more than 50,000 vehicles used the bridge every 24 hours.

In popular culture

The Waalbrug can be found in the 1977 film A Bridge Too Far, Band of Brothers (book) and the computer games: Medal of Honor: Frontline, Medal of Honor: Vanguard, Medal of Honor: Airborne and Battlefield V.

References

Arch bridges
Bridges completed in 1936
Bridges over the Rhine
Road bridges in the Netherlands
Steel bridges in the Netherlands
Bridges in Nijmegen